Paremhat 16 - Coptic Calendar - Paremhat 18

The seventeenth day of the Coptic month of Paremhat, the seventh month of the Coptic year. In common years, this day corresponds to March 13, of the Julian Calendar, and March 26, of the Gregorian Calendar. This day falls in the Coptic Season of Shemu, the season of the Harvest.

Commemorations

Martyrs 

 The martyrdom of Saint Sidhom Bishay
 The martyrdom of Saint Belasius

Saints 

 The departure of Saint Basil the great, Bishop of Jerusalem
 The departure of Saint Joseph the Bishop 
 The departure of Saint George the Ascetic

Other commemorations 

 The commemoration of the first departure of Saint Lazarus, the Beloved of Christ

References 

Days of the Coptic calendar